End Day is a 2005 docu-drama produced by the BBC. It aired on the National Geographic Channel, on the TV series, National Geographic Channel Presents, and BBC Three that depicts a set of five doomsday scenarios. The documentary follows the fictional scientist Dr. Howell, played by Glenn Conroy, as he travels from his London hotel room to his laboratory in New York City, and shows how each scenario affects his journey as well as those around him, with various experts providing commentary on that specific disaster as it unfolds. After each 'End Day' runs its course, the day repeats, this time with the next scenario panning out.

The following descriptions of the program were released by the BBC:

"Imagine waking up to the last day on Earth..."

"Inspired by the predictions of scientists, End Day creates apocalyptic scenarios that go beyond reality. In a single hour, explore five different fictional disasters, from a giant tsunami hitting New York to a deadly meteorite strike on Berlin."

Scenarios
Below are the various catastrophes depicted in the order they occur in the film:

Mega-Tsunami
In this scenario, a volcanic eruption of Cumbre Vieja on the island of La Palma in the Canary Islands triggers a massive landslide. A sizable portion of the island collapses into the sea, causing a massive tsunami, 500 feet tall, to race across the Atlantic Ocean. The United States Navy searches for the wave and locates it, predicting that the mega-tsunami will strike the East Coast of the United States. An evacuation of New York City is ordered but not completed by the time the wave arrives and levels the city, killing thousands of people but leaving many sturdier buildings intact. A briefing by the U.S. Government after the flood waters started receding reveals that the wave travelled over two miles inland; many of those who survived the arrival of the wave in New York had climbed staircases to the upper floors of the city's taller buildings.

Killer Meteorite
This scenario begins with a mysterious 'missile attack' in a remote area in the Middle East. The 'missiles' are soon revealed to be small asteroid fragments, the advance guard of a much larger asteroid on a collision course with Earth, threatening Berlin, Germany. The asteroid is located, and the militaries of Germany, Britain, and the United States attempt to alter its course using nuclear ICBMs. The attempt fails, resulting in the asteroid being broken into hundreds of smaller pieces. Berlin is evacuated by air and rail, with those unable to escape seeking shelter in the city's U-Bahn stations, leaving the city largely deserted. Countless smaller meteorites rain down across Berlin, while a speeding train manages to escape just in time to avoid the heart of the city's obliteration by the largest of the asteroid fragments, leaving behind a large impact crater where the Reichstag once stood.

Global Pandemic

In this scenario, a respiratory virus, a variant of influenza known as the "Far East Virus" with similarities to SARS is unleashed in the United Kingdom after an infected passenger from a flight known as UK Airlines 009, which originated in Hong Kong, begins infecting people on a London Underground train by coughing uncontrollably. The virus wreaks havoc as it spreads phenomenally throughout the rest of Europe; cases start popping up in North America and other countries. Meanwhile, a young woman from London and her daughter attempt to make their way to her mother's house, knowing she was one of the passengers on board the flight. Arriving at the housing estate where her mother lives, the woman goes to post a message through her mother's postbox, unaware that she is lying dead just behind the house's front door. A man desperate to leave the quarantine zone steals the woman's car with her daughter still inside but dies after crashing into a lamppost not far away; a soldier approaches the car and rescues the child. Countries around the world enact martial law and close their borders in a frantic attempt to quarantine the spread of the disease; however, they are unsuccessful, and the outbreak reaches the scale of the 1918-20 Spanish flu pandemic, killing millions of people across the globe.

Supervolcano
In this scenario, the supervolcano beneath Yellowstone National Park begins to become active, showing the initial signs of activity through volcanic earthquakes in Wyoming. Volcanic activity quickly increases in the area at an exponential rate. A family of tourists visiting Yellowstone die after the ground surrounding a geyser explodes, sending their car hurtling down a hill right before Yellowstone itself explodes, incinerating everything within 100 kilometres of the caldera. A driver fleeing from a pyroclastic flow is killed after driving the wrong way down a highway into the side of a jackknifing 18-wheeler, whose own driver is then presumably killed by the pyroclastic flow. The volcanic ash launched high into the atmosphere causes chaos, grounding the aviation industry across America and Europe and being projected to bring a period of global cooling to the planet. In the final scene, injured survivors emerge from the wreckage of Denver, Colorado, the city having been scorched by lava and pyroclastic flows and enveloped in ash clouds. This segment has only aired in the UK. The BBC docudrama Supervolcano explored this scenario more in-depth.

Strange Matter
This is the only scenario in which Dr. Howell reaches his laboratory unhindered, with people protesting outside and shouting, "Stop the experiment!" On numerous television screens, scientists talk about a new type of matter, the strangelet, and just how unlikely it is for one to be formed. Upon arrival, Howell and his colleagues initiate a highly controversial experiment using the world's largest particle accelerator. The experiment quickly goes out of control, which ironically results in the creation of a single strangelet as scientist Brian Cox describes just what the mysterious particle can do. The strangelet first causes the collider and most of the surrounding area to explode, then rises out of the ground and converts the whole planet into strange matter, starting with New York City. The strangelet wreaks havoc on the Earth's climate, with newly-converted strange matter distributing itself around the globe, devouring Paris and spreading. A Boeing 747 slams into a Boeing 777 while attempting to flee the storm, killing all on board both aircraft. Off-screen, the strangelet finishes consuming and converting the planet into a sphere of pure strange matter. This scenario establishes that, by preventing Dr. Howell from reaching his laboratory, the other scenarios saved humanity, as it was confirmed that the facility would be shut down and the experiment not done if Dr. Howell did not make it.

However, after the plane crashed, the physicist Frank Close reassured us that this particular scenario was unlikely to happen, as scientists had already done similar experiments by the time the movie was produced, and no disaster came after it. This is the only scenario in the film that doesn't end with a scientist saying that "it's not a question of if but when", as Close ends the segment by saying that "It makes great science fiction, great entertainment, great television, but on this – we can sleep easy".

Alternate versions
All original official sources cite five different scenarios including a giant volcanic explosion, but the volcanic explosion segment has never been aired in the United States. It has been edited out by the National Geographic Channel. Possibly for time problems or the inaccurate depiction of the Western United States and Yellowstone park. All references to it on the National Geographic website have been removed. Only the other four scenarios have been aired. However, the BBC website had the super volcano segment until it was removed sometime after 28 May. 2006. UKTV History aired the version including the supervolcano segment on 23 January 2007. However, in the original BBC airing each of the scenarios showed the attempts of a family or person to escape the depicted disaster as well as following Dr. Howell, these segments were mostly cut from the UKTV History version aired in 2007. The volcano sequence can however be found on the popular video website YouTube.

A French-dubbed version of End Day was also aired in France (on the channel W9) and in Belgium (on RTBF), under the title Fin du monde : les quatre scénarios (End day: the four scenarios). The "super volcano" scenario was not included.

In-film references
At one point when Dr. Howell drives off in a taxi at the beginning of the second segment, a front of a cinema is visible behind with "Groundhog Day now showing". In Groundhog Day, the protagonist is stuck in a single day of his life, repeating it time after time with minor variations – similar to the life of Dr. Howell. Transitions between the disasters are shown such that it turns out that the prior disaster was actually a movie on a TV that has been left running overnight and the credits would roll as Dr. Howell's alarm clock goes off.

See also
 Extinction event
 Near-Earth Object

References

External links
 
Video.Google.com: HorizonEndDay.mp4 

 

BBC television docudramas
British television documentaries
National Geographic (American TV channel) original programming
Science docudramas
2005 British television series debuts